Slad is a village in Gloucestershire, England, in the Slad Valley about  from Stroud  on the B4070 road from Stroud to Birdlip.

Slad is notable for being the home and final resting place of Laurie Lee, whose novel Cider with Rosie (1959) is a description of growing up in the village from his arrival at the age of three in 1917.

Locale
The Slad Brook runs along the bottom of the valley. The small parish church, Holy Trinity Church, is a Grade II listed building and there is also a small traditional pub, The Woolpack.

Governance
Slad is in the civil parish of Painswick, in Stroud District, in the county of Gloucestershire and the parliamentary constituency of Stroud.

Notable people
Slad is both the home and the final resting place of Laurie Lee, whose novel Cider with Rosie (1959) is a description of growing up in the village from his arrival at the age of three in 1917. Having bought a cottage there with the proceeds from the book, he returned to live permanently in the village during the 1960s after being away for some thirty years. Lee is buried in the village churchyard; the inscription on his headstone reads "He lies in the valley he loved"

Between 1970 and 1980 the poets Frances and Michael Horovitz lived at "Mullions", the end cottage of the settlement of Piedmont in an offshoot of the valley only accessible by foot from Slad. Frances' poetry from that period often refers to the surroundings there, as does Michael's Midsummer Morning Jog Log (1986). Horovitz's continued occasional residence is testified not simply by that poem but by his use of the cottage as the editorial address of his magazine New Departures into the 1990s.

Polly Higgins, FRSGS was a Scottish barrister, author, and environmental lobbyist, described by Jonathan Watts in her obituary in The Guardian as, "one of the most inspiring figures in the green movement". She left her career as a lawyer to focus on environmental advocacy, and unsuccessfully lobbied the United Nations Law Commission to recognise ecocide as an international crime. She died on 21 April 2019, at the age of 50 and is buried in Slad.

References

External links

Photographs of Slad and surrounding area on Geograph
Audio history of the area (Slad filter)
comment & photographs of paintings of badgers on fence posts in Slad Lane

Villages in Gloucestershire
Painswick